The Minister of State is a position within the Cabinet of Greece.

History
The position is a development of the Minister without Portfolio (Υπουργός άνευ χαρτοφυλακίου), renamed in 1991. It has no fixed functions, each minister's responsibilities is defined ad hoc by the Prime Minister in each cabinet. The most usual role is the supervision of the General Secretariat to the Prime Minister and the General Secretariat to the Government, as well as the General Secretariats of Information and of Media, which resulted from the breakup of the former Ministry for the Press and the Media. The Minister of State has hence often functioned as the government spokesman.

List of ministers

Ministers without Portfolio
1918–1919: Emmanouil Repoulis
1918–1919: Alexandros Diomidis
1919–1920: Andreas Michalakopoulos
1920–1922: Aristeidis Stergiadis
1921: Spyridon Stais
1921–1922: Charalampos Vozikis
1921–1922: Georgios Alexandropoulos
1922: Nikolaos Triantafyllakos
1922: Charalampos Vozikis
1922: Spyridon Stais
1935: Ioannis Metaxas
1935: Petros K. Mavromichalis
1944: Georgios Sakalis (Government-in-exile)
1944: Anastasios Tavoularis (Collaborationist government)
1944: Konstantinos Rentis (Government-in-exile)
1944: Petros Rallis (Government-in-exile)
1944: Spyridon Tsakopoulos (Government-in-exile)
1944: Emmanouil Sophoulis (Government-in-exile)
1944–1945: Georgios Kartalis
1944–1945: Lampros Lamprianidis
1945: Georgios Sideris
1945–1946: Georgios Kafantaris
1945–1946: Nikolaos Kazantzakis
1946: Georgios Papandreou
1946: Sofoklis Venizelos
1946: Panagiotis Kanellopoulos
1946–1947: Apostolos Alexandris
1947: Napoleon Zervas
1947: Sofoklis Venizelos
1947: Ioannis Politis
1947–1948: Dimitrios Lontos
1947–1948: Georgios Melas
1948–1949: Michail Mavrogordatos
1948–1950: Michail Ailianos
1948–1949: Konstantinos Rodopoulos
1948–1950: Vasilios Stephanopoulos
1949: Alexandros Diomidis
1949–1950: Sofoklis Venizelos
1949: Spyros Markezinis
1949: Emmanouil Loulakakis
1949–1950: Michail Mavrogordatos
1950: Grigorios Kasimatis
1950: Loukas Sakellaropoulos
1950: Dimitrios Gontikas
1950: Leon Makkas
1950: Manousos Voloudakis
1950: Leonidas Spais
1950: Stavros Kostopoulos
1950–1951: Georgios Papandreou
1950: Lampros Lamprianidis
1950: Efstathios Malamidas
1950–1951: Anastasios Vgenopoulos
1950: Gerasimos Vasiliadis
1950: Konstantinos Tsaldaris
1950: Georgios Lazanas
1950: Theodoros Desyllas
1950–1951: Emmanouil Kothris
1950: Konstantinos Rodopoulos
1950–1951: Ioannis Giannopoulos
1950–1951: Stylianos Choutas
1950–1951: Kosmas Alexandridis
1951–1952: Georgios Varvoutis
1951–1952: Ioannis Zigdis
1952: Panagiotis Kanellopoulos
1952–1955: Emmanouil Tsouderos
1952–1956: Georgios Exintaris
1956–1958: Grigorios Kasimatis
1963: Ioannis Giannopoulos
1963: Ioannis Toumpas
1963: Stefanos Stefanopoulos
1964: Stefanos Stefanopoulos
1964: Michail Stephanidis
1964: Evangelos Arvanitakis
1964–1965: Pavlos Vardinogiannis
1964–1965: Ioannis Giannopoulos
1965: Anastasios Droulias
1965: Georgios Melas
1965–1966: Dimitrios Vourdoumpas
1965–1966: Alexandros Karathodoros
1965: Iakovos Diamantopoulos
1965–1966: Apostolos Pagkoutsos
1965–1966: Anastasios Droulias
1966: Emmanouil Loulakakis
1966: Georgios Igoumenakis
1966: Stamatios Manousis
1968–1971: Dimitrios Patilis
1970–1971: Loukas Patras
1970–1971: Nikolaos Ephesios
1971–1972: Emmanouil Fthenakis
1973–1974: Ilias Balopoulos
1977–1981: Konstantinos Papakonstantinou
1977–1981: Georgios Kontogeorgis
1980: Ioannis Palaiokrassas
1980–1981: Stavros Dimas
1981–1982: Evangelos Kouloumpis
1984: Paraskevas Avgerinos
1984: Anastasios Peponis
1987–1989: Athanasios Philippopoulos
1988–1989: Christos Markopoulos
1988: Konstantinos Laliotis
1989: Emmanouil Kefalogiannis
1990–1991: Michail Theodorakis
1990–1991: Ioannis Kefalogiannis

Ministers of State
1991–1992: Michail Theodorakis
1991–1992: Ioannis Kefalogiannis
1991–1992: Tzannis Tzannetakis
1991–1992: Athanasios Kanellopoulos
1992–1993: Andreas Andrianopoulos
1995–1996: Antonios Livanis
1998–2000: Konstantinos Gitonas
2000–2001: Miltiadis Papaioannou
2001–2003: Stefanos Manikas
2003–2004: Alexandros Akrivakis
2004–2008: Theodoros Roussopoulos
2007: Xenophon-Rodolphos Moronis
2009–2011: Haris Pamboukis
2011: Ilias Mosialos
2011–2012: Georgios Stavropoulos
2011–2012: Pantelis Kapsis
2012: Antonios Argyros
2012–2015: 
2015 (January–August): Panagiotis Nikoloudis, Alekos Flambouraris and Nikos Pappas
2015 (August–September): Panagiotis Nikoloudis and Eleftherios Papageorgopoulos
2015–2019: Alekos Flambouraris 
2015–2016: Nikos Pappas
2016–2019: Christoforos Vernardakis and Dimitris Tzanakopoulos
2019–present: Kyriakos Pierrakakis and 
2021–present:

References

External links
Minister website 
Greek ministries, etc – Rulers.org

Government ministers of Greece
Lists of government ministers of Greece